Frances Minkoff (February 5, 1915 – April 22, 2002) was an American lyricist best known for her songs co-written with Fred Hellerman of The Weavers.

Career
Her collaborations include the anti-war song "Come Away Melinda"—recorded in 1963 by Harry Belafonte and Judy Collins, and later by Tim Rose, Bobbie Gentry, and rock bands UFO, Uriah Heep, and Velvett Fogg, among others—together with "Poverty Hill", "The Borning Day", "First Day Of Forever" and "Sunflower", also first recorded by Belafonte.

Her most famous church hymns are O Healing River set to music by Fred Hellerman and Every Man Neath his Vine and Fig Tree set to an ancient Israeli melody.

Minkoff died in New York City at the age of 87.  Her husband, Harry Minkoff, died in New York City on 4 June 2011.

References

External links

1915 births
2002 deaths
American women composers
20th-century American women musicians
20th-century American composers
20th-century women composers